Hoveton & Wroxham railway station is on the Bittern Line in Norfolk, England, serving the village of Hoveton and the adjacent village of Wroxham (the two settlements are usually regarded as one).

It was previously the site of a junction, with the East Norfolk Railway to  diverging from the Norwich line a short distance north of the station; however the former line closed to all traffic in 1982 and was subsequently dismantled.

The station is managed by Greater Anglia, which also operates all passenger trains that call.

Heritage connection
This heritage line opened in 1990, reusing the former line's route. The heritage station is linked to the main Hoveton & Wroxham station by a footpath.

Services

Trains run hourly between Norwich and Sheringham. 
There are fewer services on Sundays, which alternate every hour between a stopping service (calling at all stations) and a semi-fast service that only calls at North Walsham and Cromer.

References

External links 

Railway stations in Norfolk
DfT Category F1 stations
Heritage railway stations in Norfolk
Former Great Eastern Railway stations
Railway stations in Great Britain opened in 1874
Greater Anglia franchise railway stations